Nakayamagawa Gyaku Tyouseiti Dam is a gravity dam located in Ehime Prefecture in Japan. The dam is used for power production. The catchment area of the dam is  km2. The dam impounds about 3.18  ha of land when full and can store 177 thousand cubic meters of water. The construction of the dam was completed in 1963.

References

Dams in Ehime Prefecture
1963 establishments in Japan